Metropolis is the fourth studio album by Sister Machine Gun, released on July 15, 1997 by TVT and Wax Trax! Records. The album spent more than 14 weeks on the CMJ Radio Top 200 chart, peaking at #7.

Reception

Stephen Thomas Erlewine of allmusic gave Metropolis a four out of five stars, saying "even if the group isn't showing any signs of great leaps in creativity, Metropolis is one of the group's most consistent efforts, offering a pummeling array of rattling beats and shattering guitars."

Track listing

Notes
Recorded at Warzone Recorders & Chicago Recording Company, Chicago and Battery Studios K2, New York by John Fryer, Chris Randall, Van Christie III, Jason McNinch, and Matt Warren.
Mixed at Battery Studios K2 by John Fryer and Chris Randall and Warzone Recorders by Van Christie III and Jason McNinch.
Assisting at Battery was Martin Czembor
Assisting at Warzone was Abel Garibaldi
Metropolis was produced by Chris Randall and John Fryer, except track 4 produced by Chris Randall and Van Christie III.  Additional production by Jason McNinch.
Most of the analog synth sounds on this record were created using the Studio Electronics SE-1 and sampling was accomplished with the Kurzweil K2500.
Chris Randall plays Parker Guitars.
The song Bitter End contains an intro sample from the 1996 song Ratfinks, Suicide Tanks, Cannibal Girls by White Zombie, from the Beavis And Butt-head soundtrack.

Accolades

Personnel
Adapted from the Metropolis liner notes.

Sister Machine Gun
 Chris Randall – lead vocals, guitar, keyboards, Hammond B3, piano, programming, production, recording

Additional performers
 Catherine Bent – cello
 Martin Czembor – mixing, backing vocals
 Richard Deacon – bass guitar
 Ted Falcon – violin
 John Fryer – effects, additional programming, backing vocals, recording, additional production
 Reeves Gabrels – guitar
 Serena Jost – cello
 Lisa Randall – spoken word (1)
 Amanda Riesman – string arrangement
 Brian Sarche – guitar
 Kevin Temple – drums
 Rob Thomas – violin
 Mars Williams – saxophone

Production and design
 Van Christie – spoken word, recording, mixing, production (4)
 Abel Garibaldi – mixing
 Robin Glowski – design
 Jason McNinch – additional programming, recording, mixing, additional production (4)
 Michael D. Ryan – management
 Matt Warren – recording

Release history

References

External links 
 
 

1997 albums
Albums produced by John Fryer (producer)
Sister Machine Gun albums
TVT Records albums
Wax Trax! Records albums